James Morris (born 2 January 2000) is an English college soccer player who plays for the Seattle Redhawks men's soccer program.

Playing career

Doncaster Rovers
Morris made his professional debut in a 1–0 victory over Sunderland U21's on 3 October 2017 in the EFL Trophy coming on as 45th minute substitute for Andy Williams.

Seattle University Redhawks 
Morris entered university at Seattle University in Seattle, Washington in 2019. He plays for the university's varsity men's soccer team which competes in the Western Athletic Conference. He scored a brace on his debut against Houston Baptist, and a hat trick against CSU-Bakersfield on 19 October.

References

External links

 James Morris at Seattle University Athletics

2000 births
Living people
Association football forwards
Doncaster Rovers F.C. players
English footballers
Seattle Redhawks men's soccer players
Tamworth F.C. players